George Strachan Ramsay (18 October 1892 – 8 August 1918) was a Scottish professional footballer who played in the Scottish League for Queen's Park, Rangers, Ayr United and Partick Thistle as an inside right.

Personal life 
Ramsay attended Allan Glen's School and in 1911 was working as an apprentice marine engineer in Glasgow. Ramsay served as a flight lieutenant in 110 and 49 Squadrons of the Royal Air Force during the First World War and was flying an Airco DH.9 when he and his observer were shot down and killed near the bridge at Béthencourt-sur-Somme on 8 August 1918, during the Battle of Amiens. He is commemorated on the Arras Flying Services Memorial.

Career statistics

References 

Scottish footballers
1918 deaths
British military personnel killed in World War I
Royal Air Force officers
Sportspeople from Clydebank
Footballers from West Dunbartonshire
Clydebank Juniors F.C. players
Scottish Junior Football Association players
Scottish Football League players
Queen's Park F.C. players
Association football inside forwards
1892 births
Rangers F.C. players
Ayr United F.C. players
Partick Thistle F.C. players
Royal Air Force personnel of World War I
People educated at Allan Glen's School
Third Lanark A.C. players